The 2005 Mediterranean Games football tournament was the 15th edition of the Mediterranean Games men's football tournament. The football tournament was held in Almería, Spain between 23 June and 3 July 2005 as part of the 2005 Mediterranean Games and was contested by 9 teams, all countries were represented by the U-23 teams (although in fact none of the players named were older than 21); Spain won the gold medal.

Participating teams
These nine teams were sorted into three groups of three teams. The top two teams in each group advanced to the quarter finals, as well as the two best third-placed sides.

Squads

Venues

Tournament
All times are local (CEST (UTC+2)

Group stages

Group A

Group B

Group C

Knockout stage

Quarterfinals

Semifinals

3rd place match

Final

Final standings

References

 
2005
Football
Mediterranean Games
2005
Med